is a former Japanese football player.

Club statistics

References

External links

1984 births
Living people
Kobe International University alumni
Association football people from Osaka Prefecture
Japanese footballers
J2 League players
J3 League players
Japan Football League players
Mito HollyHock players
Kamatamare Sanuki players
FC Ryukyu players
Blaublitz Akita players
Association football defenders
People from Takaishi, Osaka